Dracophyllum rosmarinifolium, commonly known as inaka and common grass tree, is a species of shrub endemic to the North and South Islands of New Zealand. It was first described by Georg Forster in 1786 as Eparcris rosmarinifolium and gets the specific epithet rosmarinifolium for its similarities to species from the former genus Rosmarinus. A 2017 assessment using the New Zealand Threat Classification System classified it as "Not Threatened," giving it an estimated population of over 100,000.

References

Citations 

rosmarinifolium

Endemic flora of New Zealand